Barnowo refers to the following places in Poland:

 Barnowo, Pomeranian Voivodeship
 Barnowo, West Pomeranian Voivodeship